was a Japanese architect. He was born in the city of Kanazawa, Ishikawa Prefecture, Japan. He was a graduate of Tokyo University Department of Architecture and professor at Tokyo Institute of Technology from 1929 - 1965. As an architect, he created over 50 buildings and 10 memorials and participated in many professional activities as a statesman of Japanese modern architecture. “Yoshirō Taniguchi must be regarded as one of the most widely known, and, in the best sense, popular architects in Japan. Taniguchi is also well known for his writings and has made a name for himself as a designer of tombs, monuments and memorials which are all exquisite in themselves and suited to their surroundings.”.

Biography 
Taniguchi's career bridges traditional Japanese building and the shift to western modernism.

By the time he entered Tokyo University in 1925, he had already seen the old architectural world of Tokyo give way to the new revivalist style coming from across the ocean including Frank Lloyd Wright’s Imperial Hotel, or worse, crumble to the ground in a series of terrible earthquakes, culminating with the great Kanto earthquake of 1923.

He searched for a new way of building that would be capable of surviving such devastation, one in which European engineering and construction technologies promised great freedoms and advances, along which with came new styles. But in a country that had set its sights on modernization, it was the modern architectural movement, especially the International Style from Germany, which so impressed Taniguchi that he undertook a journey there, invited to design the garden for the Japanese Embassy under the guidance of notorious German architect Albert Speer.

In Germany, Taniguchi was much impressed by the severe classicism of Karl Friedrick Schinkel whose somber, elegant, formalism shared a grand and minimalist quality with Speer’s work, all in the service of great monumental projects: museums, halls, monuments.

With the outbreak of war in Europe, Taniguchi returned to Tokyo on the Yasukuni-maru, the last ship to sail for Japan from Europe during the war, only to see his own country drawn into the same war he was fleeing, and once again, to see it destroyed even more completely than all the earthquakes before and after.

After 1947, Taniguchi found the “style” of modern European architecture not quite right for Japan, certainly not for the important cultural buildings he suddenly found himself tasked with creating. He attempted to integrate the many disparate influences which inspired him: the traditional forms and craft-based aesthetics of old Japanese architecture, the “universal” classicism of ancient Greece that inspired Schinkel, the Germanic reductivism that transformed classicism into a modern idiom through the work of Schinkel into Speer's awesome expressions of State institutions, the idealistic pure aesthetics of the International Style as embodied by the radical new projects of Le Corbusier and Mies Van der Rohe, the utopian promise of the democratic transformation of cities through the architecture of the Bauhaus, all coalescing around the most critical question: how to build the large new buildings out of the new materials - steel and concrete - that could make a new city, and one in particular that could resist the great earthquakes that had so afflicted Japan.

In a country that had become infatuated with the modern style, Taniguchi began to be the iconoclast. “His work was always in conscious contrast to that of modernists such as Maekawa and Tange, and he continually broadened the possible range of modern architectural vocabulary in Japan.” Taniguchi's idea of modernism reflected the Meiji era approach to the traditional culture of Japan by which even Greek classicism could be seen as modern. “Corbusier and the modern architecture influenced Taniguchi, but he is also in sympathy with Classical, particularly Renaissance, architecture.”  It is for this reason that Taniguchi straddles the spectrum from traditional to modern and makes it difficult to place him specifically at any one point leading some to see him as “a link between the newer school of modern architects and the more conservative school that based its work more directly on Japanese vernacular traditions.”

Taniguchi's work took the form largely of projects in the public realm, with a focus on cultural entities which not only had to serve important practical functions but which also were burdened with conveying Japan's cultural wisdom, both looking back at a lost and tragic history as well as looking to instill new ideals and a promise of the future. There was no better place to do so than in the educational sector and he was embraced by several universities to produce a number of buildings for their newly re-built and growing campuses, as well as many of the museums, theaters, cultural centers, and monuments that would become important parts of the new Tokyo.

In the course of re-building, Taniguchi came to realize the importance of saving the remnants of the traditional buildings of Japan, and in 1952, he became an active participant in the historical preservation movement, joining Japan's Cultural Properties Specialists Council as well as the Japan Agency for Cultural Affairs. One of his lesser known undertakings was the creation, in 1965, of the Meiji Mura Village, a vast compound north of Nagoya dedicated to the re-construction and salvage of the great and typical buildings of the Japan that inspired him, the Meiji era and modern works that typified the Japanese interpretation of western architecture, including Frank Lloyd Wright’s own Imperial Hotel, demolished in 1968 and carefully re-built at Meiji Mura, piece by piece, under Taniguchi's direction.

Taniguchi is the father of Yoshio Taniguchi who, despite having designed numerous significant buildings in Tokyo, is best known for another great monument to modernism, the 2004 re-design of the Museum of Modern Art in New York.

Notable works 

 1932 Hydraulics Laboratory Tokyo Technical Institute, Tokyo
 1937 Keio University: Yochisha Elementary School Main Building & Hiyoshi Dormitory, Tokyo
 1947 Memorial Hall for Toson Shimazaki, Magome, Gifu
 1949 Keio University: Student Hall & Third School Building, Tokyo
 1952 Keio University Shin Banraisha, Tokyo
 1952 Ishikawa Textile Center, Kanazawa City
 1956 Chichibu Cement Factory, Saitama
 1958 Tokyo Tech 70th Anniversary Auditorium (Cultural Asset), Tokyo
 1958 Komoro City Fujimura Memorial Hall, Nagano
 1958 Hara Kei Memorial Museum, Morioka City, Iwate
 1959 Ishikawa Traditional Crafts Center, Kanazawa City
 1959 Chidorigafuchi War Memorial Rokkakudo, Tokyo
 1959 Togu Palace, Tokyo
 1962 Hotel Okura, Tokyo
 1962 Bunkyo Ogai Memorial Library, Tokyo
 1966 Yamatane Art Museum, Tokyo
 1966 Imperial Theater, Tokyo
 1968 Tokyo National Museum Toyokan Building, Tokyo
 1968 San Francisco Peace Pagoda, San Francisco, CA, USA
 1969 National Museum of Modern Art (MOMAT), Tokyo
 1974 Imperial Guest House, Tokyo - Restoration
 1977 Crafts Gallery of National Museum of Modern Art - Restoration
 1978 Tamagawa Library, Kanazawa City - Restoration
 1978 Aichi Prefectural Ceramic Museum, Seto, Aichi 
 1983 Reimeikan Museum, Kagoshima - (Posthumous)

Footnotes

References
 Arai, Katsuyoshi in Emanuel, Muriel ED (1980). Contemporary Architects. London, England: The Macmillan Press LTD. .
 Kultermann, Udo (1960). New Japanese Architecture. New York, NY, USA: Praeger. ASIN B0007DNXMW.
 Noffsinger, James Philip Ph.D. (1981). Yoshiro Taniguchi: Artist-Architect of Japan. Vance Bibliographies Architecture Series. Monticello, IL, USA: Vance Bibliographies. OL 17843875M.
 Sugiyama, Makiko (2006). Banraisha: A Poetic Architecture by Yoshiro Taniguchi and Isamu Noguchi. Tokyo, Japan: Kajima Institute Publishing Company. .
 Taniguchi, Yoshirō (1956). The Shugakuin Imperial Villa. Tokyo, Japan: The Mainichi Newspapers Press. .
 Watanabe, Hiroshi (2001). The Architecture of Tokyo: An Architectural History in 571 Individual Presentations. Fellbach, Germany: Edition Axel Menges. .
 “The Architects: Japan”. The Architectural Review. London: EMAP Publishing LTD (787). September 1962. ISSN 0003-861X.
 “Yoshiro Taniguchi and His Work”. The Japan Architect. Japan: Shinkenchiku-sha. May 1966. ISSN 0448-8512.

20th-century Japanese architects
1904 births
1979 deaths
People from Kanazawa, Ishikawa
Academic staff of Tokyo Institute of Technology
University of Tokyo alumni